The Burj Al Alam (English: "World Tower") was a proposed 108-story,  hyperboloid skyscraper in the Business Bay area of Dubai, United Arab Emirates, though the project's roots are in a 101-storey design called "Fortune 101" and slated for the Dubai Marina area. It was designed to resemble a crystal flower. If constructed, it would have become one of the world's tallest buildings. The tower was one of the projects of the Fortune Group, which has a number of other projects in Dubai such as the Fortune Bay and Fortune Tower.

The proposed building plan contained 74 floors of office space, a retail area at the base, and a hotel and serviced apartments in the top 27 floors. A 5-star hotel section would contain the highest hotel rooms in the world. The building would also feature a 6-storey crown that contained a Turkish bath, sky garden, and other club facilities.

Ground breaking occurred on 12 November 2006 with the tower slated for completion in 2009, but the project was dogged by delays in payments from investors due to the global financial crisis. Construction of the tower was put on hold just after piling work on the foundations was completed in 2009. The main contractor for construction had not yet been selected when a report stated the structure was expected to be completed in 2012. There was little sign of activity at the site after 2009, and no further statements regarding progress.

Sometime in 2012, the tower's official website expired and is now domain parked.  By the end of 2013, the project had been officially cancelled.  the Burj Al Alam was listed by the Dubai Real Estate Regulatory Agency's Cancelled Real Estate Projects Committee as among the list of cancelled projects awaiting liquidation hearings.

Construction gallery

See also
List of tallest buildings in Dubai
List of tallest buildings in Asia
List of buildings with 100 floors or more

References

External links 
Burj Al Alam on Emporis.com
Details of launch - AME Info
Another Article - Gulf News
Al Alam Burj Dubai - Al Alam Burj Dubai

Unbuilt buildings and structures in Dubai
Postmodern architecture
Expressionist architecture
High-tech architecture
Architecture in Dubai
Futurist architecture
Islamic architecture